The 2001–02 Barys Astana season was the 3rd season of the franchise.

Kazakhstan Hockey Championship
Source: PassionHockey.com

Standings

References

Barys Astana seasons
Barys
Barys